Roger Blaine Porter (born June 19, 1946) is an American professor currently serving as the IBM Professor of Business and Government at Harvard University. He was the master of Dunster House, one of the twelve undergraduate houses or colleges at Harvard.  He is also a senior scholar at the Woodrow Wilson International Center for Scholars in Washington, D.C. He is on the board of directors of Zions Bancorporation, a large bank holding company headquartered in Salt Lake City, Utah.

Early life
Porter grew up in Utah, Iowa, and New York and attended Brigham Young High School in Provo, Utah.  He attended Brigham Young University (BYU) for two years and was a member of the varsity men's tennis team before serving a mission for the Church of Jesus Christ of Latter-day Saints in the United Kingdom.  He received his B.A. from BYU and was selected as a Rhodes Scholar and a Woodrow Wilson Fellow earning a B.Phil. from Oxford University.  He earned his M.A. and Ph.D. from Harvard University.

Career 

Porter was selected as a White House Fellow (1974–75) and served as Special Assistant to the President and Executive Secretary of the President's Economic Policy Board (1974–77) in the Ford White House.  He joined the faculty at the John F. Kennedy School of Government at Harvard University in 1977.

Porter returned to government service at the beginning of Ronald Reagan's administration, serving as executive secretary of the Cabinet Council on Economic Affairs and as director of White House Office of Policy Development. He rejoined the Harvard faculty in the fall of 1985 as the IBM Professor of Business and Government and faculty chair of the Senior Managers in Government Program. He returned to the White House at the beginning of George H. W. Bush's administration, where he served as Assistant to the President for Economic and Domestic Policy from 1989 to 1993.

Porter has twice served as director of the Mossavar-Rahmani Center for Business and Government at Harvard (1995–2000 and 2008–11).  His teaching and research interests range widely.  In 1987 he began teaching Harvard's course on "The American Presidency" pioneered by Richard Neustadt and later taught by Doris Kearns Goodwin; he has taught the course ever since except for the years when he was serving in the White House.  He also teaches a large graduate course on "The Business-Government Relationship in the United States" as well as courses and modules on managing policy development, decision making, and economic policy.

His books include Presidential Decision Making, The U.S.-U.S.S.R. Grain Agreement, and edited volumes on Efficiency, Equity, and Legitimacy: The Multilateral Trading System at the Millennium, and most recently, New Directions in Financial Services Regulation.

He is a member of the President's Commission on White House Fellows, a member of the board of directors of the White House Historical Association, a trustee of the Gerald R. Ford Foundation, and a member of the advisory board of The Bush School of Government and Public Service at Texas A&M University.

Personal life 
Porter's son is Rob Porter, former staff secretary in the Trump Administration, who was ousted in February 2018 due to domestic violence allegations.

Works 
 Presidential Decision Making
 The U.S.-U.S.S.R. Grain Agreement
 Foreign Economic Policymaking in the United States: An Approach for the 1990s (with Raymond Vernon)
 Seattle, the WTO, and the Future of the Multilateral Trading System (edited with Pierre Sauve)
 Efficiency, Equity, Legitimacy: The Multilateral Trading System at the Millennium (edited with Pierre Sauve, Arvind Subramanian and Americo Beviglia Zampetti)
 New Directions in Financial Services Regulation (edited with Robert R. Glauber and Thomas J. Healey)

References

External links
 profile of Porter's role at the Center for Business and Government
 Walker's Research profile of Porter
 

1946 births
20th-century Mormon missionaries
Latter Day Saints from Iowa
Latter Day Saints from Massachusetts
Latter Day Saints from New York (state)
Latter Day Saints from Utah
American Mormon missionaries in the United Kingdom
American Rhodes Scholars
Assistants to the President of the United States
BYU Cougars men's tennis players
Ford administration personnel
George H. W. Bush administration personnel
Harvard University alumni
Harvard Kennedy School faculty
Living people
Reagan administration personnel
White House Fellows
Brigham Young High School alumni